Sophie Galibert is a French screenwriter, film director and writer. Her first comics Le crabe et la princesse (The crab and the princess) was published in 2016.

In 2014, Sophie Galibert wrote and directed Crevette (Shrimp), a live-action short-film nominated in numerous festivals around the world. It won twenty-two awards, including the Audience Award for Best International Short at the Spokane International Film Festival. In 2013, she received the audience award at the International Screenwriters Festival of Valence for 50's Fever. The same year, she won the award for best screenplay at the San Giò Verona Video Festival for A/K, co-written by Belgian movie director Olivier Van Hoofstadt, and screened during the 2016 Cannes Festival.

Filmography

As a screenwriter
Raccroche (2009)
Icecream (2010)
Et dieu créa la pomme ! (2012)
Bouddhi Bouddha (2012)
Waterproof (2013)
Il était une fin... (2013)
Crevette (Shrimp) (2014)
On the road (2015) directed by Marion Laine
A/K (2016) directed by Olivier Van Hoofstadt (fr)
What the hell? (2016)
Cherry (2022)

As a director
Raccroche (2009)
Icecream (2010)
Et dieu créa la pomme ! (2012)
Bouddhi Bouddha (2012)
Waterproof (2013)
Il était une fin... (2013)
Crevette (Shrimp) (2014)
What the hell? (2016)
Cherry (2022)

Children's book
Le crabe et la princesse, 2016
Nina and the magic photo booth, 2020

References

External links

Living people
French film directors
French women screenwriters
French screenwriters
French women film directors
1984 births